Immaculate Conception School may refer to:

In Canada
Immaculate Conception School (Delta, British Columbia), Delta, British Columbia

In the Philippines
Immaculate Conception School of Malolos, Malolos City, Bulacan
Immaculate Conception School for Boys, Malolos City, Bulacan
Immaculate Conception Catholic School (Umingan, Pangasinan) — a grade school and high school founded in 1948 in the Roman Catholic Diocese of Urdaneta in the Philippines

In the United States
(by state)

Immaculate Conception School (Los Angeles, California)
Immaculate Conception School (Hialeah, Florida)
Immaculate Conception School (Chicago, Illinois) in Cook County
Immaculate Conception School (Morris, Illinois) in Grundy County
Immaculate Conception School (Towson, Maryland)
Immaculate Conception School (Dardenne Prairie, Missouri) in St. Charles County
Immaculate Conception School (Jefferson City, Missouri) in Cole County
Immaculate Conception School (St. Louis, Missouri) — listed on the NRHP in St. Louis, Missouri
Immaculate Conception Church and School, Omaha, Nebraska — NRHP-listed
Immaculate Conception School (Secaucus, New Jersey) in Hudson County
Immaculate Conception School (Somerville, New Jersey) in Somerset County
Immaculate Conception School (Tuckahoe, New York) in Westchester County
Immaculate Conception School (Astoria, New York) in Queens County in New York City
Immaculate Conception School (Jamaica Estates, New York) also in Queens County in New York City
Immaculate Conception School (Bronx, New York) in Bronx County in New York City
Immaculate Conception School (Ithaca, New York) in Tompkins County
Immaculate Conception Church, School, and Rectory, Cincinnati, Ohio — NRHP-listed
Immaculate Conception School (Jenkintown, Pennsylvania)
Immaculate Conception Church and School (Denton, Texas)